PS Stour was a passenger vessel built for the Great Eastern Railway in 1864.

History

The ship was built by James Ash of Cubitt Town in London. She was placed on the Ipswich to Harwich service.

On 26 October 1864 she came to the rescue of the Alma Company's steamer Heron, which had left Ipswich at 2.45pm and broke down opposite Levington Creek and went aground on the west side of the river. Captain Mills of the Stour went alongside and took on board all of the passengers, and managed to get the Heron back into deep water.  

She was withdrawn in 1878 and replaced with a larger vessel of the same name .

References

1864 ships
Steamships of the United Kingdom
Paddle steamers of the United Kingdom
Ships built on the River Thames
Ships of the Great Eastern Railway